The Prelude Op. 28, No. 15, by Frédéric Chopin, known as the "Raindrop" prelude, is one of the 24 Chopin preludes. It is one of Chopin's most famous works. Usually lasting between five and seven minutes, this is the longest of the preludes. The prelude is noted for its repeating A, which appears throughout the piece and sounds like raindrops to many listeners.

Composition
Some, though not all, of Op. 28 was written during Chopin and George Sand's stay at a monastery in Valldemossa, Mallorca in 1838. In her Histoire de ma vie, Sand related how one evening she and her son Maurice, returning from Palma in a terrible rainstorm, found a distraught Chopin who exclaimed, "Ah! I knew well that you were dead." While playing his piano he had a dream:
He saw himself  drowned in a lake. Heavy drops of icy water fell in a regular rhythm on his breast, and when I made him listen to the sound of the drops of water indeed falling in rhythm on the roof, he denied having heard it. He was even angry that I should interpret this in terms of imitative sounds. He protested with all his might – and he was right to – against the childishness of such aural imitations. His genius was filled with the mysterious sounds of nature, but transformed into sublime equivalents in musical thought, and not through slavish imitation of the actual external sounds.
Sand did not say which prelude Chopin played for her on that occasion, but most music critics assume it to be no. 15, because of the repeating A, with its suggestion of the "gentle patter" of rain. However, Peter Dayan points out that Sand accepted Chopin's protests that the prelude was not an imitation of the sound of raindrops, but a translation of nature's harmonies within Chopin's "génie". Frederick Niecks says that in the middle section of the prelude there "rises before one's mind the cloistered court of the monastery of Valldemossa, and a procession of monks chanting lugubrious prayers, and carrying in the dark hours of night their departed brother to his last resting-place."

Description

The prelude opens with a "serene" theme in D. It then changes to a "lugubrious interlude" in C minor, "with the dominant pedal never ceasing, a basso ostinato". The repeating A/G, which has been heard throughout the first section, here becomes more insistent.

Following this, the prelude ends with a repetition of the original theme. Frederick Niecks says, "This C minor portion... affects one like an oppressive dream; the reentrance of the opening D major, which dispels the dreadful nightmare, comes upon one with the smiling freshness of dear, familiar nature – only after these horrors of the imagination can its serene beauty be fully appreciated."

References

External links
Prelude No. 15 on YouTube, performed by Martha Argerich
Prelude No. 15 on YouTube, performed by Valentina Igoshina

Compositions by Frédéric Chopin
1839 compositions
Compositions for solo piano
Chopin
Compositions in D-flat major